Arthur Morton (27 March 1882 – 21 February 1970) was an English cricketer who played first-class cricket for Derbyshire in 1901.

Morton was born in Salford, Lancashire. He made one appearance for Derbyshire in the 1901 season, at the age of  nineteen appearing against Warwickshire. He scored ducks in both innings and bowled three overs without taking a wicket in a game that Warwickshire won by an innings. He was a right-handed batsman and a right-arm medium-fast bowler.

Morton died in Sheffield at the age of 87.

References

1882 births
1970 deaths
English cricketers
Derbyshire cricketers